Kanabyevo is a rural locality (a village) in Klyazminskoye Rural Settlement, Kovrovsky District, Vladimir Oblast, Russia. The population was 19 as of 2010.

Geography 
Kanabyevo is located 14 km east of Kovrov (the district's administrative centre) by road. Osipovo is the nearest rural locality.

References 

Rural localities in Kovrovsky District